Dana Skoropad is a Canadian politician who was elected to the Saskatchewan Legislative Assembly in the 2020 general election. He represents Arm River as a member of the Saskatchewan Party. On May 31, 2022, Skoropad was appointed to cabinet as Minister of Environment.

References

Living people
Members of the Executive Council of Saskatchewan
Saskatchewan Party MLAs
21st-century Canadian politicians
Year of birth missing (living people)